The Program or The Programme may refer to:

 The Program (1993 film), an American film about college football directed by David S. Ward
 The Program (2015 film), an American biopic about Lance Armstrong directed by Stephen Frears
 The Program (novel), a 2004 novel by Gregg Hurwitz
 The Program (album), a 1998 album by the British band Marion
 The Programme, a comic book miniseries published by Wildstorm

See also
 Program (disambiguation)